Papers is a term - coined in the press - for leaking of data.  The data is commonly of a financial or governmental nature.

Papers may refer to:
 Palestine Papers, a 2011 set of confidential documents about the Israeli–Palestinian peace process leaked to Al Jazeera, which published them
 Panama Papers, 11.5 million leaked documents published from 2016
 Pandora Papers, 11.9 million leaked documents published by the International Consortium of Investigative Journalists (ICIJ) beginning on 3 October 2021
 Paradise Papers, 13.4 million confidential electronic documents relating to offshore investments, leaked to the Süddeutsche Zeitung, widely shared with the ICIJ et al., & made public from 2017
 The Penkovsky Papers : The Russian Who Spied for the West., a 1965 CIA-commissioned book on secrets revealed by Oleg Penkovsky
 Pentagon Papers, a 1971 leaking of the US Department of Defense's history of the US involvement in Vietnam from 1945 to 1967
 Pentagon Papers II, the name coined for the 2010 Afghan War documents leak
 Pumpkin papers, a collection of notes and microfilm hidden by Whittaker Chambers in 1948 during an investigation by the US House Un-American Activities Committee
 Xinjiang papers, a collection of more than 400 pages of internal Chinese government documents, describing   policy regarding Uyghur Muslims in the Xinjiang region

See also